The Max Bettin House at 602 E. Santa Rosa in Victoria, Texas, United States was built in 1908.  It is believed to be a work of architect Jules Leffland.  It was listed on the National Register of Historic Places in 1986.

The two-story house was built in 1908 for Max Bettin, a prominent local grocer who was a leader in the local Jewish community.  A one-story house now located at 604 E. Santa Rosa was originally located here, but was moved to make way for this house.  The house has a two-story L-shaped porch on two sides.

It was listed on the NRHP as part of a study which listed numerous historic resources in the Victoria area.

See also

National Register of Historic Places listings in Victoria County, Texas

References

Houses completed in 1908
Houses in Victoria, Texas
Houses on the National Register of Historic Places in Texas
National Register of Historic Places in Victoria, Texas
1908 establishments in Texas